Mitophis is a genus of snakes in the family Leptotyphlopidae. All of the species were previously placed in the genus Leptotyphlops. All members of this genus are endemic to the island of Hispaniola (in the Dominican Republic and Haiti).

Species
The genus contains the following species:

 Mitophis asbolepis
 Mitophis calypso, Samana threadsnake
 Mitophis leptepileptus,  Haitian border threadsnake
 Mitophis pyrites, Thomas's blind snake

References

 
Snake genera
Taxa named by Stephen Blair Hedges
Taxa named by Solny A. Adalsteinsson
Taxa named by William Roy Branch
Snakes of the Caribbean